Rick Dugdale is a Canadian film producer. He is the President and CEO of Enderby Entertainment, an independent film finance and production company. He is also co-founder of Vuele

Career
Dugdale joined Daniel Petrie, Jr. & Company as Vice President, Production in 2003 before becoming a full partner in the company in 2004. He, then founded Enderby Entertainment with Petrie in 2006. Dugdale also gained experience in public sector financing and investor relations while working in oil, gas, and uranium markets.

Dugdale produced Dawn Patrol (2014) and Rosemont (2015), both films were directed by Daniel Petrie, Jr.. Dugdale also produced About Cherry, co-written and directed by Stephen Elliott. For Tony-Seven Films, Enderby Entertainment's genre film division, Dugdale served as executive producer on The Speak, Vile and 5 Souls and as producer on A Haunting at Silver Falls, No Tell Motel and Blood Shed. Dugdale also served as executive producer on Tony-Seven Films’ first sequel, the upcoming A Haunting at Silver Falls 2.

Dugdale produced and financed the thriller Blackway in 2015, the first film collaboration involving Alfredson, Enderby Entertainment, and, worldwide distributor Electric Entertainment. Directed by Daniel Alfredson, Blackway was adapted for the screen by Joseph Gangemi & Gregory Jacobs, based upon the novel Go with Me by Castle Freeman, Jr. The film world premiered at the 72nd Venice Film Festival ahead of its 2016 release.

In 2017, Dugdale produced the psychological thriller An Ordinary Man in collaboration with actor/producer Sir Ben Kingsley and writer/director/producer Brad Silberling. Dugdale also, as Enderby CEO, financed and produced the film. Dugdale also arranged for its international distribution by Dean Devlin’s Electric Entertainment, marking Enderby’s second collaboration with the Electric. Dugdale recently produced the film Night Hunter, starring Henry Cavill, Sir Ben Kingsley, and Alexandra Daddario.

Dugdale produced the Intrigo anthology, three stand-alone movies shot back to back across Europe. The films were shot primarily in Serbia, but also filmed on location in Belgium, Croatia and Slovenia. Intrigo is based upon a series of European best-sellers by the Swedish author Håkan Nesser. The three stand-alone thrillers, adapted by Daniel Alfredson & Ditta Bongenhielm, are stories interconnected by the Café Intrigo, which gives the three films their overall title. All three films were released in 2020, with Lionsgate serving as the distributor for the films in the US. Intrigo: Death of Author, starring Ben Kingsley & Benno Fürmann, was released in theaters and on-demand in the US on January 17, 2020. Intrigo: Dear Agnes, starring Gemma Chan and, Intrigo: Samaria, starring Pheobe Fox, were released in theaters on-demand May 5, 2020. All three films are directed by Daniel Alfredson, the director of Enderby Entertainment’s Blackway.

Dugdale finished post-production on the Second World War action thriller "Recon” in collaboration with Academy Award® winning director Robert Port. Recon released in the US on November 10, 2020. With Brainstorm Media set to distribute in the US. Recon had its world premiere at the 2019 Austin Film Festival.

In May 2020, in the middle of a shutdown due to the COVID-19 pandemic, Dugdale announced Enderby Entertainment would be begin shooting Zero Contact (FKA 92), with thewasire film being shot in demand across 17 countries. With Dugdale serving as director for the film. Dugdale remotely supervised the virtual shoot in each country with the actors’ own homes serving as the set. The production collaborated with the post-production team at People in the Park.

Dugdale announced in July 2020, that Enderby and tech developer Draganfly were teaming to launch Safe Set Solutions for feature and TV productions. Safe Set Solutions will allow for resumption of filming on set during the global pandemic, by using a variety of prescreening tools and on set protections to mitigate health threats. Draganfly has committed to purchase initial Safe Set Solutions for two upcoming Enderby feature productions, Firewatch and Legacy.

In 2012, the Austin Film Festival announced the addition of a new “Enderby Entertainment Award” to the festival’s screenwriting competition. Finalists and winners are selected by Dugdale and Petrie.

Membership
Dugdale is a member of the Producers Guild of America and Directors Guild of Canada.

Filmography

References

External links
 

Film producers from British Columbia
Living people
Year of birth missing (living people)